Teresa Maida Cormack (18 June 1981 – 19 June 1987) was a six-year-old murder victim from Napier, New Zealand. After fifteen years, advances in genetic analysis led to conviction of Jules Mikus (28 September 1958 – 6 December 2019) for the crime. He had been identified as a potential suspect early in the investigation, but had offered an alibi that was accepted at the time.

Murder and death 
Teresa lived in Napier, New Zealand, with her mother, Kelly Piggot, and her younger sister Sara. Although reluctant to go to school on the day after her birthday, Cormack departed home on her normal walking route to Richmond Primary School, which was a short distance from where she lived. However, she did not go to school and instead wandered the streets in the suburb of Maraenui for around an hour.

Eight days later, Cormack's body was discovered at the base of a tree on Whirinaki Beach by a woman walking her dog. An autopsy revealed that she had been raped and suffocated.

Investigation 
Three male pubic hairs were found orally and in her underwear, and semen was found vaginally on Cormack's body. However, genetic fingerprinting at the time was not advanced enough to find her killer. 

Jules Mikus (born 28 September 1958), who committed many sex crimes as a teenager, was questioned by police and provided samples of his saliva and blood. Mikus provided an alibi for the time the abduction was believed to have occurred. Afterwards, he was excluded as a suspect.

Breakthrough 

The Cormack murder case was re-opened in 1998 and new testing was done at a crime lab in the United States. Due to advances in genetic fingerprinting, a minute sample of semen stored sealed between two microscope slides was able to be profiled in 2001 by technicians at ESR (Environmental Science & Research, a Crown Research Institute owned wholly by the New Zealand government).

Despite having this profile, an arrest was not immediate. A public television broadcast by the detective in charge and seen by Mikus provoked a reaction in front of the people with whom he lived but they did not contact police. Eight-hundred and forty-five blood samples had been taken, of these, four were of insufficient quality to make a profile. After nearly a year of testing the blood (taking until 22 February 2002), only one blood profile matched the semen and it came from Mikus.

On 26 February 2002, fifteen years after Cormack's death, police arrested Mikus for the murder. Although Mikus pleaded not guilty, a jury found him guilty for kidnapping, rape, sexual assault and murder. He was sentenced to life imprisonment for murder, preventative detention for rape, and 14 years each for the sexual assault and abduction, all served concurrently, with a minimum non-parole period of 10 years.
Mikus died while serving a life sentence for the death of 6-year-old Teresa Cormack. It was reported he was dying from a brain tumour and died 9 December 2019.

Aftermath 
The case attracted widespread interest in New Zealand. 

In 2004, Rowene Marsh-Potaka (who had campaigned to stop her brother from being paroled for murder) collaborated with Cormack's mother Kelly Piggot to write an anti-parole song. They wanted the song to let people know that offenders such as Mikus should serve their full sentences.

Paul Rothwell's play Golden Boys, which ran at Circa Theatre in early 2006, was inspired by the Cormack case.

See also
List of solved missing person cases

References 

https://www.stuff.co.nz/national/crime/118052123/teresa-cormacks-killer-jules-mikus-dies

External links 
A mother's lament for Teresa Cormack 13 March 2004 Anne Beston New Zealand Herald
Advances in DNA testing bring Cormack Case to Court Crime.co.nz
Teresa Cormack homicide, 19 June 1987 New Zealand Police website
In Memory Of Teresa Cormack (In conjunction with JonBenét Ramsey memorial website)

Fond memories of the girl who became a sad symbol

1980s missing person cases
Female murder victims
Formerly missing people
Murder in New Zealand
2002 in New Zealand law
1987 murders in New Zealand
June 1987 events in New Zealand
Incidents of violence against girls
Missing person cases in New Zealand
Murdered New Zealand children